Borza may refer to:

Places
Borza-Strumiany, Polish village
Borza-Przechy, Polish village
Nowe Borza, Polish village
Borza, a village in Creaca Commune, Sălaj County, Romania

Other uses
Borza (surname)